The Persian Wikipedia is the Persian language version of Wikipedia. The Persian version of Wikipedia was started in December 2003. It passed 1,000 articles on December 16, 2004, and 200,000 articles on July 10, 2012. Roozbeh Pournader is the project's first administrator, developer and bureaucrat.

It is the most popular language version of Wikipedia in Iran and Afghanistan.

Number of articles
In January 2013, close to 50,000 new articles were added within a month. A few days later, on 19 February 2013, the Persian Wikipedia reached 300,000 articles, ranking it 18th among all Wikipedias based on number of articles.

It currently has  articles, making it the 19th largest Wikipedia by article count.

History of the number of articles:

 19 December 2003: started
 18 February 2006: reached 10,000 articles
 30 October 2008: reached 50,000 articles
 25 August 2010: reached 100,000 articles
 9 July 2012: reached 200,000 articles
 19 February 2013: reached 300,000 articles
 18 July 2014: reached 400,000 articles
 27 July 2016: reached 500,000 articles
 3 May 2018: reached 600,000 articles
8 November 2019: reached 700,000 articles
26 May 2021: reached 800,000 articles
13 April 2022: reached 900,000 articles

Article depth

Issues 
Freedom of expression in Persian-speaking countries of Iran,  Tajikistan, and Afghanistan is low.

Copyright 

Knowledge about copyright rules is poor in Iran that hinders users.

Cost of bandwidth 
Tariffs for National Information Network is 75% cheaper than internet price.

Citation 
Iran ranks last in Freedom House freedom of the press ranking, there is a challenge for finding Persian citations.

Ministry of Islamic Culture and Guidance 

According to reports by Human rights lawyer Shadi Sadr, RFERL, Iranwire, Iran International, Justice for Iran, Open Democracy, Radio Zamaneh and other news outlets, the Ministry of Islamic Culture and Guidance and the Iranian Cyber Army may be interfering the Persian Wikipedia, although the Wikimedia Foundation denies that there is abuse taking place. In 2019, German news outlet Deutsche Welle reported that WMF had launched an investigation.

Censorship
In a November 2013 report published by the Center for Global Communication Studies of the University of Pennsylvania, researchers Collin Anderson and Nima Nazeri scanned 800,000 Persian language Wikipedia articles and found that the Iranian government blocks 963 of these pages. According to the authors, "Censors repeatedly targeted Wikipedia pages about government rivals, minority religious beliefs, and criticisms of the state, officials, and the police. Just under half of the blocked Wiki-pages are biographies, including pages about individuals the authorities have allegedly detained or killed." Anderson said that Persian Wikipedia, as a microcosm of the Iranian internet, is a "useful place to uncover the types of online content forbidden and an excellent template to identify keyword blocking themes and filtering rules that apply across the greater internet."

On 2 March 2020, during the COVID-19 pandemic in Iran, the Persian Wikipedia appears to be disrupted in Iran after the death of Mohammad Mirmohammadi, who was a close confidant to the country's  Ali Khamenei.

Gallery

See also
 List of Wikipedias
Tajik Wikipedia

References

External links

 Persian Wikipedia mobile version 

Wikipedia
Persian-language websites
Wikipedias by language